Malte Mårtensson (24 September 1916 – 22 April 1973) was a Swedish footballer. He played in 16 matches for the Sweden national football team from 1937 to 1949. He was also named in Sweden's squad for the Group 1 qualification tournament for the 1938 FIFA World Cup.

References

1916 births
1973 deaths
Swedish footballers
Sweden international footballers
Sportspeople from Helsingborg
Association footballers not categorized by position
Helsingborgs IF players